is a Japanese actress. She made her screen debut by winning the heroine audition for 1987 film Shōnan Bōsōzoku. She starred in NHK's morning drama series Seishun Kazoku in 1989. She portrayed Keiko, the female protagonist, in Palme d'Or winning The Eel directed by Shohei Imamura. She also makes regular appearances in Masayuki Suo's films. She won the award for best actress at the 17th Hochi Film Award for Okoge, Sumo Do, Sumo Don't, Future Memories: Last Christmas.

Awards and nominations
  1991, won Awards of the Japanese Academy for 'Newcomer of the Year' for Isam sozoku (1990), Bakayaro! 3: Henna Yatsura (1990) and Inamura Jane (1990)
  1992, won Hochi Film Awards for ‘Best Actress’ for Sumo Do, Sumo Don't (1992), Future Memories: Last Christmas (1992) and Okoge (1992)
  1992, won Nikkan Sports Film Awards for ‘Best New Talent’ for Sumo Do, Sumo Don't (1992), Future Memories: Last Christmas (1992) and Okoge (1992)
  1993, won Yokohama Film Festival ‘Festival Prize’ for ‘Best Supporting Actress’ for Sumo Do, Sumo Don't (1992), Future Memories: Last Christmas (1992) and Okoge (1992)
  1993, won Japanese Professional Movie Awards for Sumo Do, Sumo Don't (1992)
  1993, nominated for Japanese Academy Award for 'Best Supporting Actress' for Sumo Do, Sumo Don't (1992)
  1998, nominated for Japanese Academy Award for 'Best Actress’ for The Eel (1997)

Filmography

Film
(partial list)
 Shōnan Bakusōzoku (湘南爆走族) (1987)
 Inamura Jane (稲村ジェーン Inamura Jeen) (1990)
 Baka Yarō! 3: Henna Yatsura (バカヤロー!3 へんな奴ら) (1990)
 Sumo Do, Sumo Don't (シコふんじゃった。 Shiko Funjata.) (1991)
 Future Memories: Last Christmas (未来の想い出) (1992)
 Okoge (おこげ) (1992)
 Home Work  (1992)
 "47 Ronin" (1994)  Hori
 Chūshingura Shijūshichi-nin no Shikaku (忠臣蔵 四十七人の刺客) (1994)
 Gerende ga Tokeru Hodo Koi Shitai (ゲレンデがとけるほど恋したい。) (1995)
 Shall We Dance (Shall We ダンス Shall We Dansu) (1996) as Natsuko
 Ningen Isu (人間椅子) (1997)
 The Eel (うなぎ) (1997): Shimizu shot to worldwide fame at the 1997 Cannes Film Festival where this film won the Palme d'Or. For her role in this film, Shimizu was nominated for the Japanese Academy Award for Best Actress.
 Zakurokan (柘榴館) (1997)
 Gimu to Engi (義務と演技) (1997)
 Dr. Akagi (カンゾー先生 Kanzō-sensei) (1998)
 Atsumono (あつもの) (1999)
 Kyū no Ichi Kinyūdō (九ノ一金融道) (1999)
 Warm Water Under a Red Bridge (赤い橋の下のぬるい水 Akai Hashi no Shita no Nurui Mizu) (2001): Shimizu plays a woman with a rather bountiful problem—she fills up with water and the only way to get rid of it, is to make love...  Entered into the Official Selection of the 2001 Cannes Film Festival.
 The Sea is Watching (海は見ていた Umi wa Miteita) (2002): About samurai-era girls in a small seaside town brothel.  Shimizu plays the slightly older, diffident Kikuno, a big sister to the younger girls in the house.  Kimuno has two regular customers—an abusive middle-aged yakuza and a tender elderly widower who asks her to move in with him—but she weaves her own mysterious and forlorn story. Screenplay by Akira Kurosawa, directed by Kei Kumai.
 Paper Moon Affair (プライベート・ムーン Puraibeeto Mūn) (2005): Shimizu stars as Keiko, an enigmatic Japanese beauty, married to a domineering Chinese husband, forced to find herself while lost in a small town in the remote Pacific Northwest.
 Ubume no Natsu (姑獲鳥の夏) (2005)
 Nijūni-sai no Wakare: Lycoris Hamizu Hanamizu Monogatari (22才の別れ Lycoris 葉見ず花見ず物語) (2005)
 "Umikaze ni fukarete" (2008)
 The Unbroken "Shizumanu Taiyō" (沈まぬ太陽) (2009)
 Rain Fall (2009)
 The Harimaya Bridge (2009)
 Memoirs of a Teenage Amnesiac (誰かが私にキスをした) (2010)
 Ren'ai gikyoku: Watashi to koi ni ochitekudasai (2010), Akiko Yazima
 Matataki (2010)
 Box! (2010)
 Shoujotachi no rashinban (2011)
 Tidy Up (short) (2011), Moe
 Little Love Song (2019)
 Gunkan Shōnen (2021)

TV series
(partial list)

 Ude ni oboe ari (TV series) (1992)  Yoshikame
 Shinjitsu ichiro (TV movie)  (1993)  Shizuko
 Namida tataete bishô seyo: Meiji no musuko, Shimada Seijiro (TV movie)   (1995)
 Kimi ga jinsei no toki (TV series)   (1997)  Kana Usami
 Hotaru no yado (TV movie) (1997)  Fuyuko
 Tokugawa Yoshinobu (TV series) (1998)  Oyoshi
 Rakuen eno hashi (TV movie)   (1998)  Shinji's elder sister
 29-sai no Yūutsu (29歲の憂うつ) (2000): played 29-year-old Kudo, an owner of a lesbian bar.
 Kokubetsu (TV movie)   (2001)  Kazue Kosaka
 Yasashii jikan (TV series)   (2005)  Inoue Mikako (the widow)
 Fūrin Kazan (風林火山) (2007): played Sanada Yukitaka's wife Shinome.
 Sonotoki made sayonara (TV movie)   (2009)
 Hi to shio (TV movie) (2009)
 Sonotoki made sayonara (TV movie) (2009)
 Ichinenhan Mate (TV movie) (2011): played (脇田静代役) on the BS-TBS award-winning TV movie.
 Tokyo Control (2011)

References

External links

 Misa Shimizu - Rotten Tomatoes Celebrity Profile
 Misa Shimizu DVDs - Netflix
 Misa Shimizu @ Filmbug

Japanese television actresses
Japanese film actresses
Asadora lead actors
1970 births
Living people
People from Nishitōkyō, Tokyo